Pennsylvania Route 338 (PA 338) is a  state highway located in Clarion County, Pennsylvania.  The western terminus is at PA 58 in Richland Township.  The eastern terminus is at U.S. Route 322 (US 322) in Ashland Township.

Route description

PA 338 begins at an intersection with PA 58 in the community of Alum Rock in Richland Township, heading north on a two-lane undivided road. The route heads through wooded areas and passes through the residential community of Turkey City. North of here, the road passes under I-80 before curving to the east and running through agricultural areas with some homes, heading into Beaver Township and passing through Monroe. PA 338 crosses over I-80 again and runs near more farmland before turning southeast through a woodland area. After passing through the residential community of Blairs Corners, the route curves northeast and passes under I-80 again. After this, the road passes through more woodland before continuing into agricultural areas. PA 338 heads north-northeast through a mix of farmland and woodland with some residences, crossing into the borough of Knox. At this point, the route becomes Main Street and runs past homes, intersecting PA 208. Following this intersection, the road curves northwest and crosses back into Beaver Township, running through more areas of farms and woods with occasional residences as an unnamed road. PA 338 enters Ashland Township and continues northwest through more rural areas, turning to the north before ending at US 322 in Kossuth.

Major intersections

See also

References

External links

Pennsylvania Highways: PA 338

338
Transportation in Clarion County, Pennsylvania